Ion Buzea is a musician.  He performed at the Cincinnati Zoo on 30 June 1971, alongside Beverly Sills and Dominic Cossa.

References

External links
 

20th-century musicians
Living people
Year of birth missing (living people)